The 1974 Milwaukee Brewers season involved the Brewers' finishing fifth in the American League East with a record of 76 wins and 86 losses.

Offseason 
 October 22, 1973: Ellie Rodríguez, Ollie Brown, Joe Lahoud, Skip Lockwood, and Gary Ryerson were traded by the Brewers to the California Angels for Clyde Wright, Steve Barber, Ken Berry, Art Kusnyer, and cash.
 March 27, 1974: Steve Barber was released by the Brewers.
 March 30, 1974: Wilbur Howard was traded by the Brewers to the Houston Astros for Larry Yount and Don Stratton (minors).

Regular season

Season standings

Record vs. opponents

Notable transactions 
 June 5, 1974: Jim Gantner was drafted by the Brewers in the 12th round of the 1974 Major League Baseball draft.

Opening Day starters 
 P:Jim Colborn
 C:Darrell Porter
 1B:George Scott
 2B:Pedro García
 3B:Don Money
 SS:Robin Yount
 LF:Johnny Briggs
 RF:Dave May
 CF:Ken Berry
 DH:Bob Coluccio

Roster

Player stats

Batting

Starters by position 
Note: Pos = Position; G = Games played; AB = At bats; H = Hits; Avg. = Batting average; HR = Home runs; RBI = Runs batted in

Other batters 
Note: G = Games played; AB = At bats; H = Hits; Avg. = Batting average; HR = Home runs; RBI = Runs batted in

Pitching

Starting pitchers 
Note: G = Games pitched; IP = Innings pitched; W = Wins; L = Losses; ERA = Earned run average; SO = Strikeouts

Other pitchers 
Note: G = Games pitched; IP = Innings pitched; W = Wins; L = Losses; ERA = Earned run average; SO = Strikeouts

Relief pitchers 
Note: G = Games pitched; W = Wins; L = Losses; SV = Saves; ERA = Earned run average; SO = Strikeouts

Farm system

The Brewers' farm system consisted of four minor league affiliates in 1974. The Danville Warriors won the Midwest League championship.

Notes

References 
1974 Milwaukee Brewers at Baseball Reference
1974 Milwaukee Brewers at Baseball Almanac

Milwaukee Brewers seasons
Milwaukee Brewers season
Mil